"From Paris to Berlin" is a song by Danish dance-pop group Infernal. It was released in 2004 as the third single from their third studio album, From Paris to Berlin.

It is known as their signature song as this was the first that charted in many countries throughout Europe and Australia in 2005 and 2006. It went to number one on the Danish Singles Chart, number two in both Ireland and the United Kingdom, and number six in Norway. The single was the United Kingdom's sixth biggest selling single of 2006. Shi Xin Hui, a female singer from Singapore, recorded a cover of this song. The cover was called "From Taipei to Beijing" and her debut album was released in the same name in November 2006.

Ahead of the 2006 FIFA World Cup, the song had been re-recorded for fans England, with lyrics celebrating the England national football team with the title "From London to Berlin". However, the song was withdrawn from radio airplay and TV following England's anticipated knockout from the World Cup. In 2007, a video of BBC Radio 1 DJ Colin Murray dancing to this song was published on the Radio 1 website.

Chart performance
"From Paris to Berlin" has been the most popular Infernal single to date and found much of its success when re-released in April 2006. After being used to support the England football squad and a video of well-known disc jockey Colin Murray dancing to the song was broadcast, the song rocketed up the charts to number two and sold many copies, coming in at number 6 on the year-end list of 2006's best-selling singles in the UK.

Music video
The official music video for the song was heavily inspired by the film Tron.

Formats and track listings
European, Australian, and New Zealand CD single
 "From Paris to Berlin" (radio version) – 3:27
 "From Paris to Berlin" (extended version) – 5:59
 "From Paris to Berlin" (Inf: club mix) – 6:22
 "From Paris to Berlin" (DJ Aligator meets Mr. President club mix) – 6:36

UK CD1 and French CD single
 "From Paris to Berlin" (radio version) – 3:29
 "From Paris to Berlin" (extended version) – 6:03

UK CD2
 "From Paris to Berlin" (radio edit)
 "From Paris to Berlin" (original extended remix)
 "From Paris to Berlin" (Uniting Nations remix)
 "From Paris to Berlin" (Hoxton Whores remix)
 "From Paris to Berlin" (video)

French 12-inch single
 "From Paris to Berlin" (extended version) – 6:03
 "From Paris to Berlin" (radio version) – 3:29
 "From Paris to Berlin" (Inf: club mix) – 6:24

German CD single
 "From Paris to Berlin" (radio version) – 3:29
 "From Paris to Berlin" (Casino radio mix) – 2:57
 "From Paris to Berlin" (extended version) – 6:03
 "From Paris to Berlin" (Inf: club mix) – 6:24
 "From Paris to Berlin" (DJ Aligator club mix) – 6:37

German mini-CD single
 "From Paris to Berlin" (radio version) – 3:29
 "From Paris to Berlin" (Casino radio mix) – 2:57

Charts and certifications

Weekly charts

Year-end charts

Certifications

References

Infernal (Danish band) songs
2004 singles
2004 songs
Central Station Records singles
Songs written by Adam Powers
Songs written by Lina Rafn
Songs written by Paw Lagermann